Creative Eclipses is a 1999 EP by alternative rock band Cave In, released on Hydra Head Records. Noted for the band's experimentation with their already established sound, the release hints at the musical direction the group would take for their next full-length album Jupiter. A remastered edition including bonus tracks was released on 12" vinyl on April 7, 2015.

Track listing

Personnel
Cave In
Stephen Brodsky – vocals, guitar
Adam McGrath – guitar
Caleb Scofield – bass
John-Robert Conners – drums

Additional
Brian McTernan – producer
Dave Murello – mastering
Jacob Bannon – design, art direction

References 

Cave In albums
1999 EPs
Albums produced by Brian McTernan
Albums with cover art by Jacob Bannon
Hydra Head Records EPs